Chris Singleton (born February 20, 1967) is a former American football linebacker who played for the New England Patriots (1990–1992, 1993) and the Miami Dolphins (1993, 1994–1996) in the National Football League.

Playing career
Singleton graduated from Parsippany Hills High School in Parsippany–Troy Hills, New Jersey, and played college football at the University of Arizona. Singleton was selected by the Patriots as the eighth pick in the first round of the 1990 NFL Draft.

External links
The Football Database: Chris Singleton
 SPORTS PEOPLE: FOOTBALL; Packers Get Ingram From the Dolphins, The New York Times, March 22, 1995
Feb 04, 1997: --  JB Brown; Chris Singleton Waived by Dolphins

1967 births
Living people
American twins
Parsippany Hills High School alumni
People from Parsippany-Troy Hills, New Jersey
Players of American football from New Jersey
Sportspeople from Morris County, New Jersey
American football linebackers
Arizona Wildcats football players
New England Patriots players
Miami Dolphins players
Twin sportspeople